Clemensia distincta is a moth of the family Erebidae. It is found in Trinidad.

References

Cisthenina
Moths described in 1905